Excavators are heavy construction equipment consisting of a boom, dipper (or stick), bucket and cab on a rotating platform known as the "house". The house sits atop an undercarriage with tracks or wheels. They are a natural progression from the steam shovels and often mistakenly called power shovels. All movement and functions of a hydraulic excavator are accomplished through the use of hydraulic fluid, with hydraulic cylinders and hydraulic motors. Due to the linear actuation of hydraulic cylinders, their mode of operation is fundamentally different from cable-operated excavators which use winches and steel ropes to accomplish the movements.

Terminology

Excavators are also called diggers, JCBs (a proprietary name, in an example of a generic trademark), mechanical shovels, or 360-degree excavators (sometimes abbreviated simply to "360"). Tracked excavators are sometimes called "trackhoes" by analogy to the backhoe. In the UK, wheeled excavators are sometimes known as "rubber ducks".

Usage

 
Excavators are used in many ways:
Digging of trenches, holes, foundations
Material handling
Brush cutting with hydraulic saw and mower attachments
Forestry work
Forestry mulching
Demolition with hydraulic claw, cutter and breaker attachments
Mining, especially, but not only open-pit mining 
River dredging
Hydro excavation to access fragile underground infrastructure using high pressure water
Driving piles, in conjunction with a pile driver
Drilling shafts for footings and rock blasting, by use of an auger or hydraulic drill attachment
Snow removal with snowplow and snow blower attachments
Aircraft recycling

Configurations

Modern hydraulic excavators come in a wide variety of sizes. The smaller ones are called mini or compact excavators.

Hydraulic excavators usually couple engine power to (commonly) three hydraulic pumps rather than to mechanical drivetrains.  The two main pumps supply oil at high pressure (up to 5000 psi, 345 bar) for the arms, swing motor, track motors and accessories while the third is a lower pressure (~700 psi, 48 bar) pump for pilot control of the spool valves; this third circuit allows for reduced physical effort when operating the controls. Generally, the 3 pumps used in excavators consist of 2 variable displacement piston pumps and a gear pump. The arrangement of the pumps in the excavator unit changes with different manufacturers using different formats.

The three main sections of an excavator are the undercarriage, the house and the arm (also boom is used). The undercarriage includes tracks, track frame, and final drives, which have a hydraulic motor and gearing providing the drive to the individual tracks. Undercarriage can also have blade similar to that of a bulldozer. The house includes the operator cab, counterweight, engine, fuel and hydraulic oil tanks. The house attaches to the undercarriage by way of a center pin. High-pressure oil is supplied to the tracks' hydraulic motors through a hydraulic swivel at the axis of the pin, allowing the machine to slew 360° unhindered and thus provides the left-and-right movement. The arm provides the up-and-down and closer-and-further (or digging movement) movements. Arms typically consist of a boom, stick and bucket with three joints between them and the house.

The boom attaches to the house and provides the up-and-down movement. It can be one of several different configurations:
Most common are mono booms; these have no movement apart from straight up and down.
Some others have a knuckle boom which can also move left and right in line with the machine.
Another option is a hinge at the base of the boom allowing it to hydraulically pivot up to 180° independent to the house; however, this is generally available only to compact excavators.
Variable angle booms have additional joint in the middle of the boom to change the curvature of the boom. These are also called triple-articulated booms (TAB) or 3 piece booms.

Attached to the end of the boom is the stick (or dipper arm). The stick provides the digging movement needed to pull the bucket through the ground. The stick length is optional depending whether reach (longer stick) or break-out power (shorter stick) is required. Most common is mono stick but there are also, for example, telescopic sticks.

On the end of the stick is usually a bucket.  A wide, large capacity (mud) bucket with a straight cutting edge is used for cleanup and levelling or where the material to be dug is soft, and teeth are not required.  A general purpose (GP) bucket is generally smaller, stronger, and has hardened side cutters and teeth used to break through hard ground and rocks. Buckets have numerous shapes and sizes for various applications. There are also many other attachments that are available to be attached to the excavator for boring, ripping, crushing, cutting, lifting, etc. Attachments can be attached with pins similar to other parts of the arm or with some variety of quick coupler. Excavators in Scandinavia often feature a tiltrotator which allows attachments rotate 360 degrees and tilt +/- 45 degrees, in order to increase the flexibility and precision of the excavator. 

Before the 1990s, all excavators had a long or conventional counterweight that hung off the rear of the machine to provide more digging force and lifting capacity. This became a nuisance when working in confined areas.  In 1993 Yanmar launched the world's first Zero Tail Swing excavator, which allows the counterweight to stay inside the width of the tracks as it slews, thus being safer and more user friendly when used in a confined space. This type of machine is now widely used throughout the world.

There are two main types of "Control" configuration generally use in excavators to control the boom and bucket, both of which spread the four main digging controls between two x-y joysticks. This allows a skilled operator to control all four functions simultaneously.  The most popular configuration in the US is the SAE controls configuration while in other parts of the world, the ISO control configuration is more common.  Some manufacturers such as Takeuchi have switches that allow the operator to select which control configuration to use.

Excavator attachments

Hydraulic excavator capabilities have expanded far beyond excavation tasks with buckets. With the advent of hydraulic-powered attachments such as a breaker, a grapple or an auger, the excavator is frequently used in many applications other than excavation. Many excavators feature a quick coupler for simplified attachment mounting, increasing the machine's utilization on the jobsite. Excavators are usually employed together with loaders and bulldozers. Most wheeled, compact and some medium-sized (11 to 18-tonne) excavators have a backfill (or dozer) blade. This is a horizontal bulldozer-like blade attached to the undercarriage and is used for levelling and pushing removed material back into a hole.

Notable manufacturers

Current manufacturers

As of July 2021, current excavator manufacturers include:

See also
Types of excavator
Compact excavator
Dragline excavator
Long reach excavator
Amphibious excavator
Power shovel
Steam shovel
Suction excavator
Walking excavator
Bucket-wheel excavator

Other
Bulldozer 
Civil engineering
Heavy equipment
Loader
Mining simulation 
Tractor
Skid-steer loader
SAE controls

References

External links

 
Excavating equipment
Heavy equipment
Mining equipment
Tracked vehicles